Arnold Malcolm "Mickey" Owen (April 4, 1916 – July 13, 2005) was an American professional baseball player, coach and scout. Considered an outstanding defensive catcher, his career was nonetheless marred by a crucial error that he committed during the 1941 World Series.

Career
As a major leaguer, Owen posted a .255 batting average with 14 home runs and 378 RBI in 1,209 games. His 929 hits also included 163 doubles and 21 triples.

Born in Nixa, in Southwestern Missouri, Owen was signed by the Cardinals in 1935 and made his major league debut in 1937, appearing in 80 games, spending the next three full seasons in St. Louis before being traded to the Brooklyn Dodgers for catcher Gus Mancuso, a minor league player and $60,000.

From 1941 to 1944, Owen averaged 46 RBI a season for the Dodgers and played for the Brooklyn team which faced the New York Yankees in the 1941 World Series. During  National League season, he set a then-record for most consecutive errorless fielding chances by a catcher (508) and finished with a .995 fielding average. Yet, ironically, Owen is most remembered in baseball lore today for a costly mistake that he committed during that year's World Series. The Yankees held a 2-games-to-1 lead entering Game 4 on October 5 at the Dodgers' home field, Ebbets Field. With the Dodgers leading 4–3 and 2 outs for the Yankees in the top of the ninth inning and the count 3–2 on Tommy Henrich, Henrich swung and missed at strike 3, which would have been the final out of the game, but the ball eluded Owen and went to the backstop, allowing Henrich to make it safely to first base. The Yankees then rallied and scored four runs in the remainder of the inning and won the game 7–4. Instead of the series being tied, the victory gave the Yankees a 3–1 lead. The next day, they  beat the Dodgers 3–1 in Game 5 and won the World Championship. The Dodgers did not return to the World Series until 1947 and didn't win the series until 1955.

Owen played for Brooklyn until the end of the 1945 season. He then served in the Navy at the end of World War II.

After his discharge from the military in 1946, Owen expected to return to Brooklyn, but he failed to reach an agreement with the Dodgers and signed a contract to be a player-manager  in the Mexican League, which was then outside of organized baseball and offering MLB players constrained by the reserve clause higher pay to "jump" their contracts. Other big leaguers who fled to Mexico included Alex Carrasquel, Danny Gardella, Max Lanier, Sal Maglie, Luis Olmo, Fred Martin, and (briefly) Vern Stephens, attracted by very good salaries. In retaliation for the defections, Commissioner Happy Chandler sought a lifetime suspension for all of them, although his initial penalty was later reduced to three years.

Owen's suspension was lifted in June . By then, Roy Campanella and Bruce Edwards were entrenched as Brooklyn's catchers. Owen was claimed off waivers on July 2 by the Chicago Cubs and he returned to the majors on July 4 against the Cardinals at Wrigley Field. Starting at catcher, he went hitless in three at bats (ironically, against Lanier and Martin, whose suspensions had also been lifted the month before, and who pitched for St. Louis that day). Owen played for the Cubs through the 1951 season, became a player-manager with the Norfolk Tars in the Yankees' farm system, then finished his major league playing career with the Boston Red Sox in 1954.

Following his retirement as a player, Owen spent two seasons (1955–56) as a Red Sox coach, managed the Jacksonville Braves of the Sally League for part of the 1957 campaign, then worked for the Cubs as a scout.

He returned to the Ozarks and founded the Mickey Owen Baseball School on Route 66 near Miller, Missouri, in 1959. Owen sold the school in 1963, but remained an instructor until the 1980s. Notable alumni include Michael Jordan, Joe Girardi, Scott Siman, Charlie Sheen and Charlie Carroll.

Personal life
In 1964, Owen ran for Greene County sheriff and won. He also won three more elections, serving in office until 1981. Owen ran for Lt. Governor of Missouri in 1980 and finished third with 13% and 79,038 votes. Owen was still playing in old timers' games in the 1980s.

Owen lived the last years of his life in the Missouri Veterans Home in Mount Vernon. He died in Springfield, Missouri, at age 89.

In popular culture

In his 1942 book Many Happy Returns: An Unofficial Guide to Your Income Tax Problems, Groucho Marx — a lifelong Dodgers fan — referenced Owen's infamous World Series error:

References

External links
, or Retrosheet
 MLB Photo Gallery – Owen's dropped third strike
 SABR BioProject – Mickey Owen article written by Jeffrey Marlett
 

1916 births
2005 deaths
American expatriate baseball players in Mexico
Azules de Veracruz players
Baltimore Orioles scouts
Baseball players from Missouri
Bentonville Officeholders players
Boston Red Sox coaches
Boston Red Sox players
Brooklyn Dodgers players
Caribbean Series managers
Chicago Cubs players
Columbus Red Birds players
Jacksonville Braves players
Kansas City Blues (baseball) players
Major League Baseball bullpen coaches
Major League Baseball catchers
Minor league baseball managers
Missouri sheriffs
National League All-Stars
Norfolk Tars players
Patriotas de Venezuela players
People from Nixa, Missouri
Rogers Rustlers players
St. Louis Cardinals players
Springfield Cardinals players